This is a list of some of the current and former democratic schools around the world.  This list also includes sub-branches of democratic schools such as Sudbury schools inspired by the Sudbury Valley School and certain anarchistic free schools that align with the broad principles of democratic education.

Australia

New South Wales: 
Currambena School Lane Cove, Sydney NSW

Victoria: 
Preshil Kew, Melbourne VIC 
Alia College Hawthorn East, Melbourne VIC

Queensland:
Brisbane Independent School Pullenvale, Brisbane QLD

Brazil
 Escola Lumiar (São Paulo)

Canada
 ALPHA Alternative School (Toronto)
 Rochdale College (Toronto) (closed)
 SEED Alternative School (Toronto)

Germany
Neue Schule Hamburg

India
Walden's Path (Hyderabad)

Israel
 Democratic School of Hadera (Hadera)

New Zealand
 Auckland Metropolitan College, Mt. Eden, Auckland--(closed December 2001)
Ao Tawhiti Unlimited Discovery, Christchurch (This is NOT a democratic school but it is a special character school. Their educational principles are very democratic, but they still have grades, exams and a curriculum. The difference between a traditional and Ao Tawhiti school is that kids at Ao Tawhiti school choose the subjects they want to attend.)
 Tamariki School, Christchurch

Portugal
 Escola da Ponte (Vila Das AVES)

United Kingdom

Currently Open
 Sands School (Ashburton, Devon)
 Summerhill School (Leiston, Suffolk)

Former democratic schools now closed
 Dartington Hall School (Devon)
 Kilquhanity School (Kirkcudbright)
 Kirkdale School (SE London)
 Malting House School (Cambridge)
 Rowen House School (Belper)
 Risinghill School (London) 
 Scotland Road Free School (Liverpool)
 The Small School (Hartland, Devon)
 The Family School (SW London)

United States

California
 Deep Springs College (Deep Springs)

Illinois
Shimer College (Chicago)

Maine
 Liberty School (Blue Hill, Maine)

Maryland
 Fairhaven School (Upper Marlboro)

Massachusetts
 The Group School, Cambridge, Massachusetts
 Mission Hill School
 Sudbury Valley School (Framingham)
 Warehouse Cooperative School

New York
 Brooklyn Free School, Brooklyn, f. 2004
 Albany Free School (Albany)
Lehman Alternative Community School (Ithaca)

North Carolina
 Arthur Morgan School (Burnsville)

Ohio
 Antioch College
 Antioch School

Oregon
 Village Free School (Portland)
 Adams High School (Portland) (closed)

Pennsylvania
 The Circle School (Harrisburg)
 The Delta Program, a program within State College Area High School (State College)
 Philadelphia Free School
 The Sphere College Project (Phoenixville)
 Three Rivers Village School (Pittsburgh)
 Upattinas School and Resource Center (Glenmoore) (closed)

Vermont
 Goddard College (Plainfield)

Virginia
 The New School of Northern Virginia (Fairfax)

Washington
 The Clearwater School (Bothell)
 Goddard College (Port Washington and Seattle)

West Virginia
 The Highland School (Highland)

See also

 Democratic education
 List of Sudbury schools
 Collaborative learning
 Constructionist learning
 Rouge Forum
 Lists of schools
 List of Montessori schools

References

Further reading
 

Democratic education
Democratic